Emma Caitlin Rolston (born 10 November 1996) is a New Zealand professional football player. She plays for Wellington Phoenix in the A-League Women.

Club career

Forrest Hill Milford
In 2016 Rolston was part of the winning team at Forrest Hill Milford in the Women's Knockout Cup, scoring in the final and beating Glenfield Rovers 4–3 on penalties (2–2 at full-time).

Illawarra Stingrays
In April 2017, Rolston moved from New Zealand to Australia to play for the Illawarra Stingrays in the NSW NPL.

Sydney FC
On 15 October 2017, Emma Rolston joined Sydney FC.

MSV Duisburg
On 25 May 2018, Rolston signed a 1-year contract with MSV Duisburg in the German Frauen-Bundesliga. After six appearances, she left the club following trouble with injuries.

Wellington Phoenix
On 1 November 2022, Emma Rolston Joined Wellington Phoenix FC (A-League Women).

International career
Rolston has represented New Zealand at U-17 in 2010 and U-20 in 2012 and 2014 at the Women's World Cup. Rolston scored twice at the U-20 World Cup in 2014, once in the 2–0 win over Paraguay in group play and once in the 1–4 loss to Nigeria in the quarter-finals.

International goals

Honours

Club 

Forrest Hill Milford:
 Women's Knockout Cup: 2016

International 

New Zealand U17
 OFC U-17s winners: 2012
New Zealand U20
 OFC U-20s winners: 2014, 2015
 FIFA U-20 quarter-finals: 2014

References

External links 

Emma Rolston Profile on Ultimatenzsoccer.com

1996 births
A-League Women players
Living people
MSV Duisburg (women) players
Sydney FC (A-League Women) players
Wellington Phoenix FC (A-League Women) players
New Zealand women's association footballers
Association footballers from Auckland
New Zealand women's international footballers
Waterside Karori players
Women's association football midfielders
Frauen-Bundesliga players
Footballers at the 2020 Summer Olympics
Olympic association footballers of New Zealand
Expatriate women's footballers in Germany
New Zealand expatriate sportspeople in Germany
New Zealand expatriate women's association footballers
Expatriate women's soccer players in Australia
New Zealand expatriate sportspeople in Australia
New Zealand expatriate sportspeople in Norway
Expatriate women's footballers in Norway
Avaldsnes IL players
Arna-Bjørnar players